Syarinus enhuycki is a species of pseudoscorpion in the family Syarinidae.

References

Further reading

 

Neobisioidea
Articles created by Qbugbot
Animals described in 1968